Thomas George Cassell (born 23 June 1993), known online as Syndicate, is an English YouTuber and Twitch streamer. Regarded as one of the earlier known gaming personalities, his videography consists of Let's Play videos on Call of Duty and Minecraft. Born in Manchester, Cassell developed a passion for a career in the gaming industry, where he purchased gaming equipment using his money from McDonald's. On 3 September 2010, Cassell registered his gaming channel "TheSyndicateProject", where he eventually found success and a large online community. His online personality and growth in viewership was recognized by Call of Duty publisher Activision and multi-channel network (MCN) Machinima, where he signed to the network to monetize his content.

Cassell's channel saw substantial growth, passing the one million subscriber milestone in June 2012, and was described by Eurogamer as "part of a phenomenon that the gaming industry has been slow to react to". Cassell reached one billion views in late 2013, and began to livestream on Twitch, hosting the same commentary over his gameplays. His Twitch channel was the first to reach one million followers in August 2014. Switching the focus of his YouTube content, Cassell later began to pursue vlogging, where his prominence in the genre took place from his life between Los Angeles and the UK.

Back in England, Cassell and his father designed his own home, purchasing a nearby property and renovating it into an extensive gaming area. Cassell has co-founded a range of businesses, one of which failed to comply with Federal Trade Commission (FTC) advertising guidelines. He has made partnerships and collaborations with other Internet personalities. He co-founded the entertainment company 3BlackDot along with Evan Fong and Adam Montoya, and became featured and specialized in other media, spanning from a mobile game to a 12-track compilation album.

Cassell was nominated for "YouTube Gamer" in 2012 at the Golden Joystick Awards and was nominated as best in "Gaming" at the 9th Shorty Awards. He was also nominated as "Best British Vlogger" in 2014 at the BBC Radio 1's Teen Awards, and in 2017, was recognized by Forbes as one of the top gaming influencers. , his gaming YouTube channel has over nine million subscribers and 2.1 billion views, and his Twitch channel has over three million followers. His two YouTube channels have a combined total of 12.2 million subscribers and 2.7 billion views.

Early life and education

Thomas George Cassell was born on 23 June 1993 in Manchester, England, and is the brother of Alice Cassell. His father worked in construction as a project manager and his mother, Karen Cassell, worked as a children's day care worker. Cassell was educated at the Blue Coat school in nearby Oldham, and sold drinks at school to purchase a 42-inch plasma TV at the age of 15, as his father wanted him to work and pay for the items he wanted to get during the time. He then attended Hyde Clarendon Sixth Form College in Ashton-under-Lyne and studied software development and video game design in 2010.

While his father was skeptical about the decision, Cassell had a passion to post Let's Play videos on YouTube. After leaving college, he briefly worked at McDonald's to purchase gaming equipment to record YouTube videos. After quitting his job and gaining a substantial following, his father and college tutor approved of his position as an online gaming commentator.

Internet career

2008–2012: Attempts at gaming, sudden growth, and corporate recognition

Before his initial success and the start of his main gaming channel on YouTube, Cassell uploaded commentary videos on various channels for three years. He started filming his gaming commentaries with his father's camera, and fashioned it with video game cases to point it at the TV. He then acquired a capture card in 2008 to record his gameplay, in which he was inspired by video compilations of no-scope sniper kills on Call of Duty from a friend. In regards to limited advances, Cassell elaborated that video capturing content for YouTube was expensive and how there were few content creators achieving success through the site during this time period. His inspiration for forming an online personality came from YouTuber Shaun Hutchinson. Cassell admired the idea of a mixture of both commentary and gameplay.

Cassell registered his gaming YouTube channel under the name "TheSyndicateProject" (renamed as "Syndicate") on 3 September 2010. On YouTube, he uploaded Let's Play videos on the video game franchises Halo, Grand Theft Auto, and Call of Duty. He came to prominence with his videos on Call of Duty: Modern Warfare 2 and the Call of Duty: Black Ops "zombies" mode. Cassell had amassed around 300,000 views on his Call of Duty gameplays when he received a contract offer from multi-channel network (MCN) Machinima. Cassell described this offer as the start of his full-time career as a gaming YouTuber. After passing 500,000 subscribers, his content featured Minecraft gameplay for the first time. His Minecraft Let's Play series included The Minecraft Project, Trinity Island, and Mianite, where Cassell forms a storyline through the game with fellow streamers on Twitch, such as Jordan Maron and Sonja Reid.

In October 2012, Eurogamer reported that Cassell had attracted the attention Call of Duty publisher Activision during a 2011 GameCity convention. At the convention, Cassell drew video game journalists' attention to the YouTube gaming community and said that endorsement from a prominent company "is the best thing ever". His channel reached one million subscribers and over 370 million views in June 2012. Kevin Dowling of The Sunday Times recognized him as the UK's most popular gamer and estimated that he earned ₤700,000 a year, or ₤60,000 a month. Dowling said that the engagement Cassell attracted was "because he lead [an exciting life] beyond his gaming videos".

2013–present: Rapid growth, vlogging and business ventures, and advertising violations
Cassell co-founded the entertainment company 3BlackDot with YouTubers Evan Fong and Adam Montoya in 2013, along with former Machinima executives Angelo Pullen and Luke Stepleton. Cassell reached one billion views on his gaming channel in late 2013. In an interview for Tubefilter, he acknowledged that the feeling was "pretty crazy" and "a huge deal, especially for [him]". Rob Waugh of Yahoo! News said Cassell had "more viewers than hit TV shows such as EastEnders". In January 2014, Cassell's gaming channel had reached 6.7 million subscribers. He began to embark on vlogging on his "Life of Tom" channel between his residences in Los Angeles and the UK. He started to receive sponsorships, which gave him free travel and gear. He reflected that his established gaming presence had significantly impacted the start of his vlogging career and opened new ventures for him.

In July, Cassell's gaming channel had reached 7.6 million subscribers and Gamasutra had listed it as the 6th most-subscribed gaming channel on YouTube. BBC North West Tonight said that after four years of his gaming channel was registered, Cassell's uploads were "watched by millions of people around the world." His Twitch channel then became the first to reach one million followers on 17 August, before Riot Games passed the milestone. Subsequently, The Guardian reported that on 24 August, Cassell had reached 120,000 concurrent viewers on a Call of Duty livestream through Twitch.

In November, Cassell signed to 3BlackDot's MCN Jetpak as the service went live for a better payment model. Gamasutra later reported that Cassell uploaded Let's Play videos of 3BlackDot's game Dead Realm, which failed to comply with FTC guidelines in regards to a disclosure of sponsorship. Cassell had been estimated to earn  a year according to Wired. In November 2015, his gaming channel was nearly at 10 million subscribers.

Cassell attracted widespread media attention in July 2016 when he promoted the skin gambling website CSGO Lotto along with Trevor Martin without disclosing a conflict of interest as vice-president of the company, in conflict with FTC regulations. In his videos promoting the site, Cassell had disclosed the endorsements in their descriptions and responded that he would be more transparent about these disclosures in the future. The FTC later reached a settlement agreement with Martin and Cassell in September 2017 for disclosing their legal relations and sponsorship deals with companies. There were no financial charges held against Cassell.

In 2016, Cassell's gaming and vlogging channel reached 10 and 2 million subscribers respectively, and in August 2018, his Twitch channel had accumulated 2.6 million followers. Throughout his vlogging career, Cassell had travelled to Abu Dhabi and the Acropolis of Athens, and  further received corporate recognition for his livestreams, as Insider ranked Cassell as the 7th most popular Twitch streamer worldwide. Activision then collaborated with Cassell to showcase and stream the "Gunfight" multiplayer mode in Call of Duty: Modern Warfare (2019) on Twitch.

Content and style

Production

Gaming and livestreaming

Cassell maintained his schedule of two gaming videos daily and chose games with high entertainment value. He described himself as a PC gamer and said that Minecraft had been the largest series on his channel. Cassell described himself as having an interest in sandbox-styled video games. He felt that gaming was supposed to be "more of an adventure, more of a show, or an entertainment platform for people to enjoy". He advised others that a high-quality gaming setup and a consistent streaming and uploading schedule was necessary for success. At an interview with Game Informer, he opined that playing a persona would negatively affect the notability of a streamer, as he prefers to be authentic with his personality. He said that people enjoy the personality of the streamer as much as the game itself, and finds livestreaming with fans and posting videos to be "like having a conversation with friends in real life". Cassell was fond of the rapid use of social interaction in livestreams.

Vlogging
Kotaku described Cassell as a daily vlogger. Further in his career, Cassell's YouTube content focused more on vlogging rather than gaming, as he explained that he had already satisfied his goals as a gamer and began to grow tired of the video genre. He has frequently played Lisa Mitchell's song "Neopolitan Dreams" in his vlogs, where he recalled that the song was one of the first tracks he received a free music license from. He noticed a growing interest towards his vlogging content, and said that his motivation "comes down to [the] experiences [there]". He considered the negative aspects of sharing his personal life through vlogging, such as the exposure of his alcoholism and the diversity of his audience. He felt that his vlogs were the source for his worldwide recognition and liked the idea of remaining authentic in his videos.

Audience and reception

In an interview with the BBC, Cassell said that he did not intend to target a specific audience but "would not advise a 10-year-old to watch [his] videos". Will Porter of Eurogamer described Cassell's personality as a "cool older brother" and "the kid everyone wanted to be friends with at school". Cassell described the demographics of his audience as "60% Americans, Canadians and [others] scattered around rest of the world", and said that he feels responsible for them due to his popularity and his encounters with fans.

Despite the efforts in becoming a YouTuber, Cassell said that the outcome and growth was worth it. He set goals for himself, which became his main motivation for content creation. He initially wanted to sustain an audience to work at a video game company. His goals included channel viewership and subscriber milestones. Considering his success, Cassell felt that his audience was "sort of like a family", and that his video content was always targeted to engage people and make them feel involved.

Other ventures

Inspired by a trip to the US in 2011, Cassell co-founded a clothing company operated by his sister and his mother. Cassell was given the role as a judge at the British Academy Games Awards, and was featured in the mobile game Zombie Killer Squad. Released in November 2013, it was the first mobile game developed by 3BlackDot's game development branch. Within nine days of release, the game had accumulated 1 million downloads and saw 2.6 million by July 2014. Stepleton believed that the success of the game was primarily due to fans of Cassell, as they "put zero promotional dollars behind traditional user acquisition". Cassell voiced Loki in the mobile game Marvel Avengers Academy and was featured in the feature-length documentary film Minecraft: Into the Nether.

Cassell was a guest star at the premiere of the Call of Duty: Black Ops III zombies map Shadows of Evil at San Diego Comic-Con 2015. He raised ₤75,000 for the Motor Neurone Disease Association in two weeks, and created the gaming fundraiser "GameStars" for the Make-A-Wish Foundation, where he supported critically ill children through gaming events at the Science and Industry Museum. In May 2016, he produced the compilation album Sounds of Syndication through record label Heard Well. The album is composed of 12 tracks of various artists, including a song from electronic trio Klaypex and "Neopolitan Dreams" from singer-songwriter Lisa Mitchell. He initially contacted the record label at a charity event to produce the album.

Personal life
Cassell owns a home constructed and designed by him and his father. He successfully became a homeowner at the age of 19, and said that he prefers to be near his hometown. Inspiration for the purchase came from his fascination with the British television series Grand Designs, and he reconstructed the home in favor of creating a space designed for gaming. BBC North West Tonight described his residence as a "₤1 million house", and Eurogamer reported that fans have traced his place of residence though Cassell's college route and Google Street View. Cassell dated Kaitlin Witcher in 2012.

Sexual assault allegations 
In June 2020, Kaitlin Witcher (Cassell's ex-girlfriend) and Natalie Casanova made allegations of sexual assault against Cassell as part of the MeToo movement. Witcher said that she was abused at a hotel at Los Angeles in 2012. Casanova stated that the incident took place at a Legends of Gaming convention at the same city in 2016. She said that one of Cassell's staff members brought her a morning-after pill the following day. Cassell denied the allegations, describing the situation as a "character assassination by social media". He said that the sex was consensual, and that Casanova had agreed to take the pill. Regarding Witcher's statement, Cassell said that he had acknowledged Witcher's personal boundaries.

Awards and nominations

See also
 List of YouTubers
 List of people from Manchester

Notes

References

External links 

 
 
 

1993 births
20th-century English people
21st-century English people
Call of Duty players
English-language YouTube channels
English video bloggers
English YouTubers
Gaming YouTubers
Let's Players
Living people
Mass media people from Manchester
Minecraft YouTubers
People from Oldham
Twitch (service) streamers
Vlogs-related YouTube channels
YouTube channels launched in 2010
YouTube controversies
YouTube travel vloggers
YouTube vloggers